Albert Robert Wukits (December 16, 1917 – October 15, 1978) was a professional football player in both the National Football League and the All-America Football Conference. During his time in the NFL, Wukits played for the "Steagles", which was the temporary merger of the Pittsburgh Steelers and Philadelphia Eagles, in 1943 and "Card-Pitt", the temporary merger of the Steelers and Chicago Cardinals, in 1944. These two teams were the result of temporary mergers brought on the league-wide manning shortages associated with World War II.

However Wukits also played for the Steelers in 1945. In 1946 he left the NFL for the AAFC, where he split that season between playing for the Miami Seahawks and Buffalo Bisons.

References
Pro Football Researchers Association AAFC deaths status

1917 births
1978 deaths
People from Millvale, Pennsylvania
Players of American football from Pennsylvania
Duquesne Dukes football players
Steagles players and personnel
Card-Pitt players
Pittsburgh Steelers players
Miami Seahawks players
Buffalo Bisons (AAFC) players
Philadelphia Eagles players